Bannon Goforth Thibodeaux (December 22, 1812 – March 5, 1866) was an American lawyer and politician who served as a member of the U. S. House of Representatives representing the state of Louisiana.  He served two terms as a Democrat from 1845 to 1849.

Biography 
Thibodeaux was born on St. Bridget Plantation near Thibodaux in Lafourche Parish. He was the son of Governor Henry S. Thibodaux. 

He attended the country schools, then studied law in Hagerstown, Maryland. He was admitted to the bar and commenced practice in  LaFourche and Terrebonne Parishes in Louisiana.

Political career 
He was member of the State constitutional conventions in 1845 and 1852, and held several local offices before being elected to the  Twenty-ninth and  Thirtieth Congresses, serving from March 4, 1845 to March 3, 1849).

Later career 
After leaving Congress, he resumed the practice of law in Terrebonne and Lafourche Parishes. He was also a sugar planter and manufacturer.

Death 
He died March 5, 1866, in Terrebonne Parish. His body is interred in the Half-way Cemetery, near Houma, Louisiana.

External links 
Bio at Congress.gov 
Political Graveyard

1812 births
1866 deaths
American people of French descent
Democratic Party members of the United States House of Representatives from Louisiana
19th-century American politicians